Stadion Miejski (English: City Stadium or Municipal Stadium) may refer to various stadiums in Poland. Larger cities, such as Warsaw, Łódź and Kraków, may have two or more municipal stadiums.
Stadion Miejski (Bełchatów)
Stadion Miejski (Białystok)
Stadion Miejski (Bielsko-Biała)
Stadion Miejski Zawiszy (Bydgoszcz)
Stadion Miejski (Chorzów)
Stadion Miejski (Elbląg)
Stadion Miejski (Gdańsk)
Stadion Miejski (Gdynia)
Stadion Miejski (Gliwice)
Stadion Miejski (Grodzisk Wielkopolski)
Stadion Miejski (Grudziądz)
Stadion Miejski (Jastrzębie-Zdrój)
Stadion Miejski (Kielce)
Stadion Miejski Cracovii (Kraków)
Stadion Miejski Hutnika (Kraków)
Stadion Miejski Wisły (Kraków)
Stadion Miejski ŁKS (Łódź)
Stadion Miejski Widzewa (Łódź)
Stadion Miejski (Łęczna)
Stadion Miejski (Mielec)
Stadion Miejski (Nisko)
Stadion Miejski (Ostrowiec Świętokrzyski), also known as Miejski Stadion Sportowy "KSZO"
Stadion Miejski (Płock)
Stadion Miejski (Poznań)
Stadion Miejski Warty (Poznań)
Stadion Miejski (Stalowa Wola), also known as Podkarpackie Centrum Piłki Nożnej
Stadion Miejski (Starachowice)
Stadion Miejski (Szczecin)
Stadion Miejski (Tychy)
Stadion Miejski Legii (Warsaw)
Stadion Miejski Polonii (Warsaw)
Stadion Miejski (Wrocław)
Stadion Miejski (Łódź)
Stadion Miejski (Zabrze)
Stadion Miejski (Ząbki)

See also 
 City Stadium (disambiguation)